Alfonso Silva Placeres (19 March 1926 – 16 February 2007) was a football player considered one of the best in the history of Canary Islands' football.

He won La liga with Atletico de Madrid in 1949 and 1950 and was in the Spain national football team which played in the 1950 FIFA World Cup in Brazil.

On 10 January 1950 he played for the Canary Islands football team against the Argentine champion San Lorenzo de Almagro which was successfully touring in Europe. The Canary Islands beat them 4–2.

In 1956 he was cast out because of a disciplinary problem by coach Barrios. He was transferred to newly created team Union Deportiva Las Palmas which paid 300,000 pesetas.

Honours
Atlético Madrid
La Liga: 1949–50, 1950–51
Copa Eva Duarte: 1951

References

External links
National team data 
 

1926 births
2007 deaths
Spanish footballers
Association football midfielders
Spain international footballers
La Liga players
Atlético Madrid footballers
UD Las Palmas players
1950 FIFA World Cup players
Footballers from Las Palmas